The South Carolina Senate is the upper house of the South Carolina General Assembly, the lower house being the South Carolina House of Representatives. It consists of 46 senators elected from single member districts for four-year terms at the same time as United States presidential elections.

The South Carolina Constitution of 1895 provided for each county to elect one senator for a four-year term. The election of senators was staggered so that half of the state Senate was elected every two years. After the U.S. Supreme Court ruled in 1964 for the case Reynolds v. Sims, the state Senate was reapportioned in 1966 as a temporary measure into 27 districts with 50 members for two-year terms. In 1967, the state Senate was again reapportioned, this time into 20 districts with 46 members for four-year terms. The number of districts was reduced to 16 in 1972 and in 1984, they were eliminated with the creation of single member districts.

The annual session of the General Assembly convenes at the State Capitol Building in Columbia on the second Tuesday of January of each year. However, after convening, either the House or the Senate may call for itself a 30-day recess by a majority vote, or a longer recess by a two-thirds vote.

Composition

Members of the South Carolina Senate 
Except as noted, all Senators were elected in November 2020 and terms began on January 12, 2021. All terms expire in January 2025.

Composition of the Senate over time

References

 Dubin, Michael J. (2007) Party affiliations in the state legislatures : a year by year summary, 1796-2006.

External links 
 South Carolina State House Online
 South Carolina Legislative Information Tracking System allows users to track legislative information via custom reports, tracking lists or subscription services. Services are provided via web search or Palm Pilot.
 The South Carolina Senate Democratic Caucus
 The South Carolina Senate Republican Caucus
 Project Vote Smart – State Senate of South Carolina

South Carolina General Assembly
State upper houses in the United States